Vasily Nikolaevich Gudin (born  in Moscow) is a Russian curler and curling coach.

As a coach of Russian men's curling team he participated in 2014 Winter Olympics, as a coach of "Olympic Athletes from Russia" (OAR) mixed doubles curling team he participated in 2018 Winter Olympics.

Record as a coach of national teams

References

External links

ГУДИН Василий Николаевич - Infosport.ru

Living people
1977 births
Curlers from Moscow
Russian male curlers
Russian curling coaches